Abu Garva or Abu Gerva or Abu Gorva, also rendered as Abu Gorveh, may refer to:
 Abu Garva 1
 Abu Garva 2